Blind is a 2016 American drama film directed by Michael Mailer, written by John Buffalo Mailer, and starring Alec Baldwin, Demi Moore, Viva Bianca, Dylan McDermott, and James McCaffrey. The film was released on July 14, 2017, by Vertical Entertainment.

Plot
Suzanne Dutchman (Demi Moore) seems to be a happily married wife. Her husband Mark (Dylan McDermott) is a businessman who continuously travels and is very well known. One day at a dinner party, Mark speaks to a client, Howard (James McCaffrey), about a deal whilst Suzanne speaks with her close friend Deanna (Viva Bianca). As Suzanne and Mark are on their way home it is revealed that the couple aren't so happy after all.

Howard is caught by an undercover female agent for using and dealing cocaine, and reveals many issues involving Mark. Mark is then arrested, and Suzanne faces charges for supporting him in his actions. The judge feels sympathy for Suzanne, mentions that she understands that Suzanne was unaware of her husband's actions, and sentences her to 100 hours of community service only.

Suzanne fulfills her court ordered community service by reading for visually-impaired/blind man Bill Oakland (Alec Baldwin), an author and English lecturer. Suzanne develops feelings for Bill and, when she finds out about her husband's affair, leans towards Bill even more.

Cast
Alec Baldwin as Bill Oakland
Demi Moore as Suzanne Dutchman
Viva Bianca as Deanna
Dylan McDermott as Mark Dutchman
James McCaffrey as Howard 
Steven Prescod as Gavin O'Connor
Jabari Gray as Andre
Renée Willett as Kelly 
Ski Carr as Ricky G.
Drew Moerlein as Tim Landry 
Eden Epstein as Ella
John Buffalo Mailer as Jimmy 
Chloe Goutal as Becca
Gerardo Rodriguez as Frank 
John-Michael Lyles as Kyle
Rae Ritke as Michelle Oakland

Production
Principal photography began in October 2015.

Release
The film premiered at the Woodstock Film Festival on October 13, 2016. Vertical Entertainment acquired distribution rights to the film on February 8, 2017 and released it on July 14, 2017.

References

External links
 
 

2016 films
2016 drama films
American drama films
Vertical Entertainment films
Films about blind people
2010s English-language films
2010s American films
Films about disability